Coast Farmer, gaining the name in 1937 and previously bearing the names  Point Arena (1928) and Riverside Bridge (1920), was a U.S. Shipping Board Emergency Fleet Corporation Design 1023 ship ordered under the name Minnewawa and built as hull #103 by Submarine Boat Company, Newark, New Jersey in 1920 Coast Farmer is noted as being a part of the Pensacola Convoy landing the supplies and troops intended for the Philippines in Darwin, Australia after being diverted on the news of the attack on Pearl Harbor. The ship became even more notable being the first of only three ships successfully running the Japanese blockade into the Philippines; leaving Brisbane February 1942. Coast Farmer was torpedoed and sunk off Jervis Bay, New South Wales on 20 July 1942.

Commercial to World War II Service
The Gulf Pacific Mail Line operated the ship as Point Arena from 1928 to 1937. The ship was acquired and operated as Coast Farmer by the Coastwise Line, a coastal line associated with Pacific Far East Lines, until taken for war time service by the War Shipping Administration on 22 December 1941, the date the Pensacola Convoy reached Brisbane Australia.

Pensacola Convoy
Coast Farmer was one of three merchant cargo ships in the convoy and largely carried civilian supplies for the shops of Guam and Manila.

Australia-Philippine Operations
Coast Farmer was provided a gun crew from the 453d Ordnance Company, loaded with military supplies including 2,500 tons of rations and departed Brisbane February 10, 1942 for the Philippines where the ship delivered its cargo at Anakan, Mindanao, on 17 February. The supplies were offloaded to the Filipino coasters Lepus and Elcano who then departed for Manila. On departure a member of the gun crew sent ashore to repair machine guns did not return in time and was left behind.

John A. Matson, master of Coast Farmer on this operation, was later awarded the Army's Distinguished Service Medal and the Merchant Marine Distinguished Service Medal. Coast Farmer became one of only three ships, the others being  and The China Navigation Company's Anhui, to successfully break the Japanese blockade. The supplies brought by the Coast Farmer were destroyed in transshipment when the smaller ships trying to reach Corregidor were sunk by gunfire from Japanese naval forces off Mindanao.

On her return she was one of seven vessels in the USFIA Army fleet and one of three assigned indefinitely. Subsequently, General MacArthur received confirmation the vessel was under War Shipping Administration charter for his use without restriction. The Coast Farmer was engaged in supporting the war effort in coastwise shipping when the Japanese submarine  torpedoed and sank her off Jervis Bay, New South Wales, Australia, on 20 July 1942. 1942. One crew member was lost. The ship was hit amidships at about 2 a.m. and sank within twenty minutes with the submarine surfacing and examining the ship's lifeboats by searchlight before departing the area.

See also
   sister ship
    sister ship
   sister ship

Notes

References

References cited

External links
 Coast Farmer photo—American Merchant Ships Sunk in WWII at U.S. Navy Armed Guard and U.S. Merchant Marine in World War II
 Photo ID #303140—Starboard side view of the American transport Coast Farmer
 SS Coast Farmer
 EFC Design 1023: Illustrations

1920 ships
World War II merchant ships of the United States
Ships sunk by Japanese submarines
Ships built by the Submarine Boat Company
Maritime incidents in July 1942
Design 1023 ships